Aisy cendré (named after Aisy-sous-Thil, a nearby town) is a French cheese made from cow milk, made by a company in Époisses, Bourgogne (Burgundy, a region in France).

It has a washed rind, contains at least 50% fat and has an average weight of 230 grams, with a diameter of 110 mm and a height of 35 mm. Its paste has a slightly smoked aroma and ripens into a soft texture, but is typically eaten while still firm. It is refined for two weeks by scrubbing the rind and is then rolled in wood ash, giving it a greyish color. Production of Aisy cendré was 7 tonnes in 1991. Being made in Époisses, it enjoys the reputation of the town's fabrication techniques, even though its preparation is very different from the other cheeses found there.

See also
 Époisses cheese
 List of cheeses

French cheeses
Washed-rind cheeses

References